Stanley John Hughes (1918–2019) was a Canadian scientist who is known throughout the global field of mycology for developing and introducing a precise and meticulous system for classifying fungi that is still used today. A naturalized Canadian, he was a federal research scientist for Agriculture and Agri-Food Canada at what is today the Ottawa Research and Development Centre.

Throughout his professional career he made exceptional contributions to the field of fungal taxonomy which significantly advanced this science around the world. His contributions not only benefited his chosen field, but unwittingly, benefited global society by introducing a more sophisticated and scientific method of classifying fungi to enable more in-depth research on moulds. His mentorship of young scientists throughout his career also helped create a new generation of mycology taxonomists dedicated to and enthralled by their research.

Biography 
Hughes was born in Llanelly, Wales in 1918.  He completed his studies at the University of Wales in Aberystwyth where he obtained a Bachelor of Science degree, (1941), Master of Science (1943) and Doctor of Science (1954).  First at Aberystwyth, then at Cardiff, he studied plant diseases through the National Agricultural Advisory Service. From 1945 to 1952, Hughes worked as an assistant mycologist at the Commonwealth Mycological Institute in Kew, England where he helped classify micro-fungi from all over the commonwealth.

In 1952 Hughes joined Canada's federal department of agriculture (AAFC) which became the Ottawa Research and Development Centre. His research played an integral role in supporting Canada's National Mycological Herbarium and the Canadian Collection of Fungal Cultures. These national reference collections help scientists identify fungi and support research to control fungal pathogens and parasites that affect Canadian agricultural production. Quite often when a disease inflicts Canadian agriculture these collections are vital in properly identifying the pathogen, detailing its characteristics, and helping scientists develop diagnostic tools and control methods.

Hughes “officially” retired in 1983, but continued his research well into his 90s as an Honorary Research Associate with AAFC at the Eastern Cereal and Oilseed Research Centre in Ottawa where he continued to untangle the complex world of sooty moulds and publish in scientific journals. He died in 2019, having recently celebrated 61 years of marriage.

Career 
Upon coming to Canada, Hughes almost immediately initiated a new era in the classification of conidial fungi, an interesting and economically important group of fungi, commonly referred to as moulds, that reproduce asexually by producing masses of spores called “conidia”.

His 1953 paper in the Canadian Journal of Botany, “Conidiophores, conidia, and classification” offered a novel and exciting approach to modifying the classification of conidial fungi which effectively turned an art into a science. He proposed a number of useful descriptive terms such as blastospore, porospore, meristem arthrospore, and basauxic conidiophores which are now widely used. This paper contained meticulously prepared descriptions, arguments and illustrations during a time when scientific papers classifying conidial fungi tended to be very difficult to work with due to their inconsistent and numerous fragmentary observations.

The approach for classifying fungi that Hughes recommended provided a prospect for improving communication, organization, and retrieval of information about conidial fungi. This has been singled out as one of the most significant papers on the systematics of conidial fungi in the twentieth century and it influenced subsequent mycological taxonomic literature. With the publication of this one paper, an entire field was transformed as scientists around the world quickly adapted the new methods and tools to segregate and classify moulds. Today proper identification and communication of these fungi all stem from the methods put forward by Hughes in 1953.

Five years after “Hughes 1953” his follow-up 1958 scientific paper contained an extensive list of more than 1,000 accepted genera, species and synonymies.  This presented proof that hyphomycetology, the classification of fungi, was now a science and provided a new starting point for the worldwide effort to collect and classify moulds.

Hughes visited several exotic places to collect and study microfungi which resulted in a plethora of over 130 publications, descriptions of hundreds of new genera and species and identification keys to help classify many moulds.  In 1949 he spent three months in Ghana as a visiting scientist and in 1955 he visited many European national and university fungal collections to trace important specimens gathered by early mycologists. A Senior Research Fellowship from New Zealand in 1963 enabled him to spend a year in that country and author more than 30 papers on the fungi of New Zealand. In 1974 he spent three months at the Mycological Institute of the University of Pernambuco in Recife, Brazil.

In the 1960s Hughes turned his attention towards “sooty moulds” or “black mildews”, a complex of fungi that had defied mycologists for almost two centuries.  This dark fungus grows on honeydew excreted by sucking insects or on exudates, the fluid that escapes from lesions on the leaves or stems of certain plants. This substance can cover plant leaves, stems and twigs in a black sticky substance. They occur sporadically through the world but are particularly abundant and conspicuous in the “mist forests” of the Pacific basin.

First mentioned by scientists in the late 1700s, sooty moulds were included in all great mycological floras of the nineteenth century. During the early nineteenth century the discovery of the sooty mould paradise in the Pacific basin intensified to involve nearly all of the world's foremost mycologists. By systematically evaluating the significance of previously unobserved or disregarded characteristics, a paper by Hughes in 1976 significantly contributed to the world-wide research effort by demonstrating that sooty moulds are not a single family but represent two different families belonging to two different orders of fungi.

Awards and recognition 
On Hughes' 80th birthday in 1998 the Canadian Journal of Botany, where many of his scientific papers were published, included two articles from colleagues paying tribute to his research.

Tributes to Hughes are also documented in two volumes commemorating the achievements of the International Mycological Institute – one published by the Centre for Agricultural Bioscience International (CABI) in 1993 and a second published by Cambridge University Press in 1996. Both books single out Hughes’ 1953 contribution as the most significant paper on the systematics of conidial fungi of the twentieth century and the most profound contribution to mycological taxonomic literature in the history of the International Mycological Institute.

Professional Honours:
Jakob Eriksson Gold Medal, Swedish Academy of Science (Third recipient, 1969 ) 
 President, Mycological Society of America (1974) 
 Member of the Royal Society of Canada (Fellow, 1974) 
 Vice-president, International Mycological Association (1971 to 1983) 
 George Lawson Medal of the Canadian Botanical Association (1981 ) 
 Distinguished Mycologist Award, Mycological Society of America  (1985) 
 Linnean Society of London (Foreign member, 1986) 
 Honorary Member, Foreign Vice President, British Mycological Society (1987 ) 
 Member to the Order of Canada “for his lifetime contribution to the field of mycology, particularly for his seminal work on the classification of various fungi and moulds, and for his mentoring of young scientists.” (2010) 
In 2009 he presided over the official opening of the National Botanical Garden of Wales Stanley J Hughes Mycological Collection where he donated over 10,000 books and reprints from his personal collection of the world-renowned taxonomic mycologist.

References 

1918 births
2019 deaths
Canadian centenarians
Men centenarians
Canadian mycologists
Fellows of the Royal Society of Canada
People from Llanelli
Alumni of the University of Wales
Agriculture and Agri-Food Canada
Welsh emigrants to Canada